
Year 147 (CXLVII) was a common year starting on Saturday (link will display the full calendar) of the Julian calendar. At the time, it was known as the Year of the Consulship of Messalinus and Largus (or, less frequently, year 900 Ab urbe condita). The denomination 147 for this year has been used since the early medieval period, when the Anno Domini calendar era became the prevalent method in Europe for naming years.

Events 
 By place 
 Roman Empire 
 Marcus Aurelius receives imperial powers, from Emperor Antoninus Pius.
 Festivals to celebrate the 900th anniversary of the founding of Rome begin. 
 King Vologases III dies after a 42-year reign, in which he has contended successfully with his rivals. 
 King Vologases IV, son of Mithridates V of Parthia,  unites the Parthian Empire under his rule.

 Asia 
 First year of Jianhe of the Chinese Han Dynasty.

Births 
 Annia Galeria Aurelia Faustina, daughter of Marcus Aurelius (approximate date)
 Jia Xu (or Wenhe), Chinese official and adviser (d. 223)
 Lokaksema, Kushan Buddhist monk and traveler (d. 189)

Deaths 
 Li Gu, Chinese scholar and official (b. AD 93)
 Vologases III, king of the Parthian Empire
 Xu Shen, Chinese politician and writer (b. AD 58)

References